Ship of fools is an allegory that has long been a fixture in Western literature and art.

Ship of Fools may refer to:

Literature 
Ship of Fools (satire), a 1494 satire by Sebastian Brant
Ship of Fools (Porter novel), a 1962 novel by Katherine Anne Porter
Ship of Fools (Stone novel), a 1997 Doctor Who spin-off novel by Dave Stone
The Ship of Fools (Spanish: La nave de los locos), a 1984 novel by Cristina Peri Rossi
Ship of Fools (Russo novel), a 2001 novel by Richard Paul Russo
The Ship of Fools, a 2001 novel by Gregory Norminton
"Ship of Fools", a short story by Charles Stross from the 2002 collection Toast: And Other Rusted Futures
Ship of Fools (book), a 2018 political book by commentator Tucker Carlson

Art 
Ship of Fools (painting) (c. 1490–1500), a painting by Hieronymus Bosch
 Ship of Fools (c. 2006–2007), a painting by John Alexander
Ship of Fools I-IV, 2016, a series of four paintings by Lucien Smith

Film and television 
Ship of Fools (film), a 1965 film based on the Katherine Anne Porter novel
Ship of Fools (Kappa Mikey episode), the fourth episode of the animated sitcom Kappa Mikey

Music

Songs 
"Ship of Fools", by The Doors from the 1970 album Morrison Hotel
"Ship of Fools", by the Grateful Dead from the 1974 album Grateful Dead from the Mars Hotel
"Ship of Fools", by John Cale from the 1974 album Fear and 1992 live album Fragments of a Rainy Season
"Ship of Fools", by Bob Seger and the Silver Bullet Band from the 1976 album Night Moves
"Ship of Fools", by Van der Graaf Generator from the 1978 album Vital
"Ship of Fools", by Soul Asylum from the 1986 album Made to Be Broken
"Ship of Fools", by Echo & the Bunnymen, B-side to the 1987 single "The Game"
"Ship of Fools" (World Party song), a 1987 single by World Party
"Ship of Fools" (Erasure song), a 1988 single by Erasure
"Ship of Fools" (Robert Plant song), a 1988 single by Robert Plant
"Ship of Fools", by The Residents from the 1992 album Our Finest Flowers
"Ship of Fools", by Sarah Brightman from the 1993 album Dive
"Ship of Fools", by Scorpions from the 1993 album Face the Heat
"Ship of Fools", by Secret Chiefs 3 from the 2001 album Book M
"Ship of Fools", by Yngwie Malmsteen from the 2002 album Attack!!
"Ship of Fools", by Alphaville from the 2003 album CrazyShow
"Ship of Fools", by Ron Sexsmith from the 2006 album Time Being
"Ship of Fools", by Doves, bonus track from the 2009 album Kingdom of Rust

Albums 
 Ship of Fools (album), a 1986 album by Tuxedomoon
Ship of Fools, a 1988 album by John Renbourn

Other 
Ship of Fools (website), a UK-based Christian website
Ship, captain, and crew, a dice game also known as Ship of Fools